Diedrich Uhlhorn (3 June 1764 – 1837) was a German engineer, mechanic and inventor.

Life 

Uhlhorn was an engineer, mechanic and inventor, who invented in 1817 the first mechanical tachometer. Between 1817 and 1830 he was inventor of the Presse Monétaire (level coin press known as Uhlhorn Press) which bears his name. He was married.

Awards 
 Order of the Red Eagle

Literature 
 Volker Benard-Wagenhoff, Konrad Schneider: Dieser unerschöpfliche, seltene Mann – Diedrich Uhlhorn und die moderne Münztechnik. Grevenbroich 2009
 Otto Albert Bormann: Dietrich Uhlhorn (1764–1837). In: Rheinisch-Westfälische Wirtschaftsbiographien, Band I. Aschendorff, Münster 1931, pages 177-195.
 Egbert Ritter von Hoyer: Uhlhorn, Diedrich. in: Allgemeine Deutsche Biographie (ADB). Band 39, Duncker & Humblot, Leipzig 1895, pages 166–168.

See also 

List of German inventors and discoverers

References 

Engineers from Lower Saxony
19th-century German inventors
1764 births
1837 deaths
People from Friesland (district)